The 2004–05 Arizona Wildcats men's basketball team represented the University of Arizona during the 2004–05 NCAA Division I men's basketball season.  Hall-of-Famer Lute Olson led the team in his 22nd year as Arizona's head coach.  The team played their home games at McKale Center in Tucson, Arizona as members of the Pacific-10 Conference.

The Wildcats recorded 30 or more wins for the third time in program history with a record of 30–7 overall.  A 15–3 record in conference play earned Olson and Arizona an 11th Pacific-10 Conference championship.

Arizona was invited to the NCAA tournament for the 21st-straight season, receiving a 3-seed in the Midwest Region.  The team advanced to the Elite Eight by defeating (14-seed) Utah State, (11) UAB, and (2) Oklahoma State before falling 90–89 in overtime to top-seeded Illinois.

Roster

Depth chart

Schedule

|-
!colspan=9 style="background:#; color:white;"| Regular season

|-
!colspan=9 style="background:#;"| Pac-10 tournament

|-
!colspan=9 style="background:#;"| NCAA tournament

|-

References

Arizona Wildcats men's basketball seasons
Arizona
Arizona Wildcats
Arizona Wildcats
Arizona